The 2019–20 Championnat National 3 was the third season of the fifth tier in the French football league system in its current format. The competition was contested by 168 clubs split geographically across 12 groups of 14 teams. The teams included amateur clubs (although a few are semi-professional) and the reserve teams of professional clubs. The season was suspended indefinitely on 12 March 2020 due to the COVID-19 pandemic.

On 16 April 2020, the FFF announced the termination of the competition, with promotion and relegation decided by points earned per game played, subject to the normal verification process by the financial authority, the DNCG.

Teams
On 17 July, the French Football Federation ratified the constitution of the competition, and published the groups as follows:

 116 teams that were not relegated or promoted from the 2018–19 Championnat National 3 groups.
 10 teams relegated from 2018–19 Championnat National 2 after any reprieves and additional administrative relegations to the Regional Leagues (Pontarlier, Nice (res), Bordeaux (res), Mont-de-Marsan, Furiani-Agliani, Boulogne-Billancourt, Le Havre (res), Feignies Aulnoye, Arras and Athlético Marseille).
 5 teams reprieved from relegation from 2018–19 Championnat National 3 groups.
 Tours, who take the place of their reserve team after administrative relegation.
 Paris Saint-Germain (res), who took a voluntary relegation from 2018–19 Championnat National 2.
 36 teams promoted from Regional Division d'Honneur (as shown in the table below).

Promotion and relegation
If eligible, the top team in each group is promoted to Championnat National 2. If a team finishing top of the group is ineligible, or declines promotion, the next eligible team in that group is promoted.

Generally, three teams are relegated from each group to their respective top regional league, subject to reprieves. Extra teams are relegated from a group if more than one team is relegated to that group from Championnat National 2. In the case that no teams are relegated to a group from Championnat National 2, one less team is relegated from that group to the regional league.

Reserve teams whose training centre are categorised as category 2B or lower cannot be promoted to Championnat National 2 by the rules of the competition. It was announced in November 2019 that the following reserve teams would be ineligible for promotion following the categorisation of their training centres:
AC Ajaccio, Clermont, Dijon, Niort, Orléans and Paris FC.

Special rule changes
Due to the premature cancellation of the season before completion, special rules were put in place by the FFF to rank clubs, superseding the normal competition rules.

 1. Points per game completed
 2. Number of points gained in head-to-head matches (only where all scheduled matches between all tied teams have completed)
 3. Goal difference in head-to-head matches (only where all scheduled matches between all tied teams have completed)
 4. Number of away games completed, as a percentage of overall number of games completed
 5. Goal difference per game completed
 6. Goals scored per game completed
 7. Fair play
 8. Better classification, based on completion of the first set of round robin games (only if all clubs have completed at least one game against all other clubs)
 9. Drawing of lots

Regional governing bodies of each league (and the FFF itself for Group D) apply these criteria and publish final league tables.

League tables

Group A: Nouvelle-Aquitaine

Group B: Pays de la Loire

Group C:  Centre-Val de Loire

Group D: Provence-Alpes-Côte d'Azur-Corsica

Group E: Bourgogne-Franche-Comté

Group F: Grand Est

Group H: Occitanie

Group I: Hauts-de-France

Group J: Normandy

Group K: Brittany

Group L: Île-de-France

Group M: Auvergne-Rhône-Alpes

Top scorers

Season outcomes

Promotion
Mont-de-Marsan, Châteaubriant, Bourges 18, Auxerre (res), Metz (res), Canet Roussillon, Beauvais, SM Caen (res), Plabennec, Versailles and Rumilly-Vallières finished in the promotion places, and were promoted to 2020–21 Championnat National 2, subject to ratification by the FFF and DNCG.

Athlético Marseille finished in a promotion place, but were initially denied promotion by the Commission Régionale de Contrôle des Clubs (CRCC) of the Ligue de Méditerranée and additionally administratively relegated to Régional 2 for financial irregularities. Their place was to have been taken by Aubagne. On 6 July 2020, the appeal committee of the Direction National du Controle de Gestion overturned this decision, and returned the file to the CRCC for reconsideration, putting the promotion position in Group D on hold. On 15 July 2020, the CRCC again denied the club promotion, handing the place back to Aubagne. The club appealed again, and on 27 July 2020 the appeal committee of the DNCG confirmed the promotion. Three days later, the disciplinary committee of the FFF announced that they were demoting the club back to National 3, due to the production of fraudulent documentation at the end of the 2018–19 season.

Tours finished in a promotion place, but were denied promotion by the Direction National du Controle de Gestion of the FFF. Their place was taken by Bourges 18.

Relegation
Bassin d'Arcachon, Pau (res), Mérignac Arlac, Les Herbiers (res), La Flèche, Saint-Cyr-sur-Loire, Dreux, Gémenos, EUGA Ardziv, Balagne, Sens, Roche-Novillars, FCM Troyenne, Sarreguemines, Aigues-Mortes, Béziers (res), Auch, Rodéo, Grande-Synthe, Le Portel, Chambly (res), Arras, Grand-Quevilly, Pacy Ménilles, Gonfreville, Trégunc, Ergué-Gabéric, Guichen, Torcy, Noisy-le-Grand, Saint-Leu, Boulogne-Billancourt, Le Puy (res), Aurillac, Thiers and Saint-Flour finished in the relegation places and were relegated to the top division of their respective regional leagues, subject to any reprieves detailed in the next section.

ASPV Strasbourg were confirmed as relegated on 6 July 2020, due to the confirmation on appeal of the relegation of Mulhouse from Championnat National 2.

Reprieves
Aurillac were reprieved from relegation on 16 June 2020, when Mulhouse were administratively relegated from Championnat National 2, which led to the reprieve from relegation of Saint-Priest.

A team may be reprieved in Group D following the eventual promotion of Athlético Marseille, however Gémenos have indicated they would reject this reprieve.

References 

2019
5
Fra
France